Hopton-on-Sea is a village, civil parish and seaside resort on the coast of East Anglia in the county of Norfolk.

The village has many amenities for tourists with  amusement arcades and food outlets. It is also home to Potters Resort, the first permanent, mixed-use holiday camp in the UK, founded in 1920. This employs approximately 560 permanent staff making it the largest private sector employer in the area.

Every January, Hopton-on-Sea hosts the World Indoor Bowls Championships at Potters Resort with players, spectators, the BBC and many others staying in the village for what is regarded as the biggest event in the bowls calendar.

History

The villages name means 'Farm/settlement in enclosed spot'. Here perhaps it's referring to the promontory jutting into marsh.

The earliest human activity in the parish dates to the  Palaeolithic era with the discovery of flint tools. There have also been artefacts found from the Bronze Age and Roman era in the area.

The oldest building in the parish is the ruins of St Margaret's church, built in the 14th century it burned down in 1865. The ruins of the old church are being restored to form a cultural centre for the village. As part of the £140,000 restoration project by the Great Yarmouth Preservation Trust, gargoyles were found on the site from the previous 11th century church. A new church of the same name was built the following year in Early English style on a new site, which is still in use today. Designed by Samuel Sanders Teulon, it contains stained glass by William Morris and Edward Burne-Jones.

During World War II a dense network of military defences were built in the area due to Hopton's close proximity to Great Yarmouth. These included anti-tank defences, pillboxes, air-raid shelters and a coastal battery. Constructed in 1940 this battery had a pair of large gun houses, for six-inch guns, and search-lights. The site was armed during and after the war, until August 1947, due to its prime location for an invasion.

Geography
The village is on the East Anglia coast, on the North Sea, it has a wide sandy beach Hopton-on-Sea Beach which runs by grassy cliffs. The beach suffers from coastal erosion and, as of 2016, sand levels have dropped by 10 ft in the last five years. The erosion has led to a project to replace the old wooden groynes with ones made of rock and the construction of a seawall. These defences are estimated to protect the area for up to a century.

The civil parish was, until 1974, in the county of East Suffolk. For local government, the parish falls within the district of Great Yarmouth.

Transport
The village has a regular, if infrequent, bus service to Norwich, Great Yarmouth and Lowestoft.

It once had its own train station, Hopton-on-Sea railway station, linking it to Great Yarmouth and Lowestoft, but this closed in 1970 due to the Beeching cuts.

Notable former residents
Dave Benson Phillips, children's presenter
Eddie Large, comedian
Joe Pasquale, comedian
Mark Noble, footballer
Laurie Sivell, footballer

References

http://kepn.nottingham.ac.uk/map/place/Suffolk/Hopton

External links
Hopton-on-Sea tourist site, Great Yarmouth Borourgh Council.

Seaside resorts in England
Villages in Norfolk
Populated coastal places in Norfolk
Civil parishes in Norfolk
Borough of Great Yarmouth